What Now? Remind Me is a 2013 Portuguese documentary film directed by Joaquim Pinto. It was selected as the Portuguese entry for the Best Foreign Language Film at the 87th Academy Awards, but was not nominated.

The film is a first-person documentary about Pinto's life with HIV, documenting both his family life with his husband Nuno Leonel and his experiences in clinical trials for various experimental antiretroviral drugs.

Cast
 Joaquim Pinto as himself
 Nuno Leonel as himself

See also
 List of submissions to the 87th Academy Awards for Best Foreign Language Film
 List of Portuguese submissions for the Academy Award for Best Foreign Language Film

References

External links
 

2013 films
2013 documentary films
2013 LGBT-related films
Portuguese documentary films
Portuguese LGBT-related films
2010s Portuguese-language films
Documentary films about gay men
Documentary films about HIV/AIDS